Eugenio Pizarro Poblete (born November 7, 1938, in San Antonio, Chile) is a Chilean Catholic priest, and politician. Pizarro was also a candidate for the presidency of Chile for the Movimiento de Izquierda Democrática Allendista that included the Communist Party, in the 1993 elections, but only managed to get 327,402 (4.70%) votes from a total of 6,968,950; the elections were eventually won by Eduardo Frei Ruiz-Tagle, from the Christian Democrat Party of Chile.

References

External links
 Pizarro's Google Profile

1938 births
Living people
Communist Party of Chile politicians
People from San Antonio, Chile
Chilean priests
Candidates for President of Chile